President of the National Legislative Assembly may refer to:
 President of the National Legislative Assembly (France; see 
 President of the National Legislative Assembly (Thailand); see List of presidents of the National Legislative Assembly of Thailand